Fleury Abbey (Floriacum) in Saint-Benoît-sur-Loire, Loiret, France, founded in about 640, is one of the most celebrated Benedictine monasteries of Western Europe, and possesses the relics of St. Benedict of Nursia. Its site on the banks of the Loire has always made it easily accessible from Orléans, a center of culture unbroken since Roman times.  In 2010, the abbey had over forty monks led by the abbot Etienne Ricaud.

Abbo of Fleury (died 1004) a monk and abbot of Fleury was a theologian of wide-ranging intellect; his life was written by the chronicler Aimoin, also a monk of Fleury. Andrew of Fleury (writing c 1043) wrote Miracula sancti Benedicti. Hugh of Fleury (died after 1118) was a monk of Fleury known for his chronicles and other writings.

Churches

Anscar Vonier, writing in the Catholic Encyclopedia says that "from the very start the abbey boasted of two churches, one in honour of St. Peter and the other in honour of the Blessed Virgin." The church of St Peter was demolished in the eighteenth century; the existing church dedicated to the Virgin pre-existed the founding of the monastery. After the ravages of the Normans, who penetrated via the Loire and burned the monastery buildings, which suffered a catastrophic fire in 1026, this became the great late eleventh-century Romanesque basilica, which occasioned the erection of a great tower, that was intended as the west front of the abbey church, which was completed in 1218. It was here that the Fleury Playbook was compiled, perhaps in dedication to the new church. The tower of Abbot Gauzlin, resting on fifty columns, forms a unique porch. The Carolingian style church is about three hundred feet long, its transept one hundred and forty feet.  The choir of the church contains the tomb of a French monarch, Philip I of France, buried there in 1108. Of the mediaeval abbey's buildings, only this basilica survives in the modern monastery.

Medieval history
The seventeenth-century Benedictine scholar Jean Mabillon accepted the traditional founding of Fleury as by Leodebaldus, abbot of St-Aignan (Orléans) about 640, in the existing Gallo-Roman villa of Floriacum, in the Vallis Aurea, the "Golden Valley". This was the spot selected by the Abbot of St-Aignan for his Benedictine foundation. Rigomarus was its first abbot.

The most famous of the Merovingian abbots was St. Mommolus, who effected the translation of the relics there of Benedict of Nursia.  
Pepin of Herstal, having considerably augmented the abbey, committed it to the direction of Saint Bain in 706.
The monastery underwent a season of reform in its monastic life, about 930, along the lines first laid out at Cluny. The monastery  enjoyed the patronage of the Carolingian dynasty for generations; it was also central to the political ambitions of the Robertian house descended from Robert I of France, several of whom had held the title Duke of the Franks. The monk of Fleury named Helgaud (died ca 1068), was chaplain to King Robert II and wrote a brief Epitoma vitae Roberti regis. Fleury had particular significance in lending legitimacy to its patrons. Although royal and ducal patronage had material advantages, there was also a price to be paid in terms of monastic autonomy when the ducal candidate conflicted with the choice of the monastic community.

Theodulphus, bishop of Orléans established at Fleury a school for young noblemen recommended there by Charlemagne. By the mid-ninth century its library was one of the most comprehensive ever assembled in the West, and scholars such as Lupus of Ferrières (d. 862) traveled there to consult its texts. Later under St. Abbo of Fleury (abbot 988-1004), head of the reformed abbey school, Fleury enjoyed a second golden age; it kept up close relations with abbeys in England. Later, among the non-resident abbots in commendam were Cardinals Odet de Coligny and Antoine Sanguin in the reign of François I and Cardinal Richelieu.

Modern history 

Like all Benedictine monasteries in France, the community was scattered by the French revolution.  Nevertheless, a Benedictine presence remained continually: the parish was held by a monk disguised as a secular priest, and there were numerous attempts to restore the monastery throughout the 19th century.
Finally, in 1944, the community (which had been resident at Pierre-qui-Vire) was restored to the abbey, which was rebuilt as a member of the Subiaco Congregation.
The monastery is remembered each day at evensong in Winchester Cathedral with an additional short said prayer at the conclusion of the responses – the Fleury Prayer.

Benedict of Nursia's relics 

Fleury is reputed to contain the relics of St. Benedict of Nursia, the father of Western monasticism. Mommolus, the second Abbot of Fleury, is said to have effected their transfer when that abbey fell into decay after the ravages of the Lombards in the seventh century. Benedict's relics, and the Miracula S. Benedicti developed over three centuries by five monks of Fleury, including Andreas of Fleury (c.1043), attracted pilgrims, bringing wealth and fame.

Monks of the Italian monastery Monte Cassino, which was founded by Benedict himself, disputed this story. They claimed that Monte Cassino possesses the remains of the body of St. Benedict, but have never shown relics as proof.

See also

List of Carolingian monasteries
Carolingian architecture
Carolingian art
Regional characteristics of Romanesque architecture
 Codex Floriacensis

Notes

References
 Elizabeth Dachowski, "Edmund of East Anglia: Life of Abbo of Fleury": an introduction to the political background.
(Dewey Library, University of Pennsylvania) Boethius, In Librum Aristotelis de Interpretatione: Manuscript probably produced at Fleury, mid-ninth century

Further reading
Anselme Davril, editor, 1990. The Monastic Ritual of Fleury. A twelfth-century ritual, Orléans, Bibliothèque Municipale MS 123 [101] 
Chenesseau, Georges. L'abbaye de Fleury à Saint-Benoît-sur-Loire (Paris: van Oest) 1933.

Benedictine monasteries in France
Basilica churches in France
Carolingian architecture
Romanesque architecture in France
Churches in Loiret
Christian monasteries in Loiret